Leonardo Brescia (1520–1582) was an Italian painter of the Renaissance period. He was born and active in Ferrara, and worked with Bastianino. He painted  an Assumption of the Virgin for the church of II Gesu, an Annunciation for the Madonna del Buon Amore; and a Resurrection for Santa Monica. He also painted the Virgin Mary for the church of III Gesu, which was an Annunciation for the Leonardo Da Vinci.

References

External links
 Census of Ferrarese Paintings and Drawings 

1520 births
1582 deaths
16th-century Italian painters
Italian male painters
Painters from Ferrara
Renaissance painters